Neuchâtel Hockey Academy, abbreviated NHA, NE Hockey Academy, or Neuchâtel HA, are a women's ice hockey club in Neuchâtel, Switzerland. The club's representative team has played in the Women's League (SWHL A), the top flight of women's ice hockey in Switzerland, since 2011. They are the only Romand club with a team in the Women's League. The other Neuchâtel Hockey Academy teams play in the SWHL C and SWHL D.

History   

In 2020, the club made the Swiss Championship finals for the first time. The finals were ultimately cancelled due to the COVID-19 pandemic.

References

External links 
 

Ice hockey teams in Switzerland
Women's ice hockey teams in Europe
Swiss Women's League teams